This is a list of Maldivian films released in 2014.

Releases

Theatre releases

References

External links

Maldivian
2014